Hafravatn is a small lake on the eastern outskirts of Reykjavík, Iceland. Located at 76 m above sea level, it has an area of 1.02 km² with a greatest depth of 28 m. The Seljadalsa River flows into it from the east and its discharge is Ulfarsfellsa. A small village lies on the northern bank of the lake and a paragliding take-off point on its eastern side. The smaller lake of  Langavatn lies to its southwest.

References

Lakes of Iceland
Geography of Reykjavík